Arhopala amantes, the large oakblue, is a species of lycaenid or blue butterfly found in Asia.

Arhopala amantes is the largest lycaenid. It is surprisingly inconspicuous on the wing despite the brilliant metallic blue markings on its upperside. In the female, the blue scales are restricted to the centre and basal part of both wings; the outer margins are marked by a wide black band.

Description

Ecology
It is a butterfly of the canopy of small trees, occasionally coming down to settle on shrubs and low bushes. It flies about a great deal during the day but often with long periods of resting in between flights. To rest, it usually selects a leaf exposed to full sun at a considerable height above ground.

The eggs are laid on the leaves of Syzygium, Terminalia and Hopea species. The larvae and pupae are always attended by red ants.

It is not endangered.

Gallery

References

Arhopala
Butterflies of Asia
Butterflies described in 1862
Taxa named by William Chapman Hewitson